Chaah is a town and mukim in Segamat District, Johor, Malaysia. It is the southernmost mukim in the district, but it is administered as a suburb of Labis.

Chaah consists of Kampung and Taman Chaah Town, C-Block, Kampung Baru (residents are mostly Chinese), Kampung Java (Malay Kampung), Taman Damai Jaya I & II, Taman Sri Chaah, Taman Orkid, and is surrounded by oil palm plantations.

Established in the early 1970s, Desa Temu Jodoh got its name from the grand wedding ceremony among many couples of early settlers. The number of couples married during the wedding ceremony was said to be the largest at that time in Malaysia.

Name
The name "Cha'ah" or "Chaah" is derived from its geographical location. Chaah is situated between mapping of three rivers. The Mandarin pronunciation of Chaah is "San He Gang" (三合港).
- "San" means three
- "He" means join
- "Gang" means port

There are a rumours about how the name was coined.

It may be named "Chaah" because the early owner of this inner harbour was named Cha Ah Kong.

Further, back in the early 1960s, Chaah villagers lived along the Sungai Chaah (River Chaah). The main transportation was Sampan (small boat). Sampan is used for travelling to other towns, namely Batu Pahat which is the nearest one.

Geography

The mukim has a total area of 184 km2.

Demographics 
As of 2010, Chaah has a total population of 2,549 people. The following is based on Department of Statistics Malaysia 2010 census.

There is a big Indian community in Chaah (about 4000 families). They all originate from the estates. The Indians are well grown people at Chaah. Many of them have own houses and lands, some others doing own business such as farming (bela lembu), contractors and so on. Tamils or Indians mainly live in Taman Muhibbah, Taman Mesra, Taman Mewa, Taman Indah, Taman Damai Jaya and Taman Nesa.

Education

Primary school

Sekolah Kebangsaan Seri Bali
Sekolah Kebangsaan Desa Temu Jodoh
Sekolah Jenis Kebangsaan (Tamil) Cantuman Chaah
Sekolah Jenis Kebangsaan (Cina) Cha'Ah

Secondary school
Sekolah Menengah Kebangsaan Chaah

2. Sekolah Menengah Kebangsaan Seri Bali

See also 
 Bekok
 Segamat
 Labis
 Yong Peng

References

External links
 Chinese Chaah BBS

Mukims of Segamat District